Thirty a Week is a lost 1918 silent film drama directed by Harry Beaumont and starring Tom Moore and  sixteen year old ingenue Tallulah Bankhead in one of her first screen appearances. It was produced and distributed by Goldwyn Pictures.

Cast
Tom Moore as Dan Murray
Alec B. Francis as Mr. Wright
Brenda Fowler as Mrs. Wright
Warburton Gamble as Freddy Ruyter
Grace Henderson as Mrs. Murray
Ruth Elder as Minnie Malloy (*Ruth Elder, not the aviatrix)
Tallulah Bankhead as Barbara Wright (*uncredited)

References

External links

1918 films
American silent feature films
Lost American films
American black-and-white films
Films directed by Harry Beaumont
Goldwyn Pictures films
American films based on plays
Silent American drama films
1918 drama films
1918 lost films
Lost drama films
1910s American films
1910s English-language films